Minister of Consumer Affairs may refer to:

Minister for Family and Consumer Affairs of Denmark
Minister of Consumer and Corporate Affairs in Canada
Minister of Consumer and Corporate Affairs (Manitoba) in Canada
Minister of Consumer Affairs, Food and Public Distribution (India)
Minister of Consumer Affairs (New Zealand)